Jerome Elston Scott is an American screenwriter, director, actor and film and television producer.

Scott grew up in New York City and Orlando, Florida in what has been described as an "..extremely open progressive environment. My parents definitely allowed for personal growth and individuality…Our differences were celebrated, encouraged even. Suppression was not something that was practiced in my adolescent experience and it has given me the confidence I need to survive, especially in Hollywood." [1],[2]

His love of movies and television began early when he watched movies with his parents. Some of his favorite actors were Dustin Hoffman, Meryl Streep, Sidney Poitier, Jimmy Stewart, Katharine Hepburn, Diana Ross, Dick Van Dyke, River Phoenix. On television, there were Michael Landon and Carol Burnett. [9]

He is famously known for the best afro of all time (Sorry Shaun Livingston)

As a child he appeared in commercials for McDonald's, Universal, Disney, Nickelodeon and Steak 'n Shake. [3]

Scott worked as part of the opening crew at Universal Studios Florida alongside other Universal alumni Joey Fatone,  Wayne Brady and Cheryl Hines. Though he describes it as "a great job" he quickly realized that the Florida Studio was geared more towards hospitality than movies and he, his boyfriend and two others moved to Los Angeles. [4]

Early career 
In 1999, one week after he arrived in Los Angeles, Scott was cast as a runaway in the film Lethal Weapon 4. More work soon followed. Hollywood, in the middle of the teen movie explosion, made quick use of his commercial look and Scott made memorable, albeit brief, appearances in several movies and television shows including Whatever It Takes, Orange County, Boy Meets World, Brink, Smart Guy, Boston Public and multiple episode appearances on Buffy the Vampire Slayer, Roswell, and the Judd Apatow-led Freaks and Geeks and Undeclared. The last two served him well as he caught the writing/acting bug and under the tutelage of Judd Apatow and employing several actors from those two shows wrote, directed and co starred in his first full-length feature film Anderson's Cross.[5]

Anderson's Cross 
Sticking to the adage of write what you know, Scott wrote Anderson's Cross, a semi autobiographical coming of age story, which garnered mostly good reviews for its story, acting and directing[6].[7],[8],[17] 
 Anderson's Cross was rated R by The Motion Picture Association of America.
 The film won several awards including Best Feature at The independent Black Film Festival and Best International Feature at The Bridgetown International Film Festival [15].[16]
 In April 2011 TLA Video named Jerome Best Lead Actor In A Gay Role for his portrayal of Nick Anderson in Anderson’s Cross.[10]

Career 
 In February 2011 Jerome appeared in the music video "We Are" by artist Jake Walden. [11]
 Beginning in 2012 Scott directed a series of infomercials for producer David Douglass.
 On October 26, 2011 Scott directed the music video "Even In Your Doubt" for recording artist Jake Walden. [11]
 In March 2014 Scott directed the music video "New Home" for artist Leslie Deep.
 In  December 2014  Scott directed the music video "Summer Song" for artist Beau LePaige. The song was a nod to 1980s classic movies The Breakfast Club, Sixteen Candles, Weird Science, Pretty In Pink and Ferris Bueller's Day Off. The video starred LePaige as well as Teen Wolf star Stephen Lunsford. The video was released January 2015 The video ends with a nod to one of Scotts favorite directors: screenwriter/director John Hughes with the following quote: "I don't want to be too cool. You get so caught up with whether you're doing it right." -John Hughes [14]
 In March 2015 Scott directed the music video "Marilyn Monroe" for recording artist Beau LePaige. The video stars Wizards of Waverly Place star Jennifer Stone as well as LePaige.[14] The video was released April 2014
 Scott has written a film called Hostage Diner which is being shot in Victoria, Canada.[12], [13]
 Scott has written and will direct a film called The Perfect Night about teenagers who get stuck in an elevator on the night of their prom.[12]
 Scott has an alien invasion film in development that is currently called The Untitled Jerome Elston Scott Project.
 Scott is currently in pre production on the film tentatively entitled Prep School which is set to begin shooting in Spring 2016

Filmography

Awards 
[1] Harvey, Del (November 21, 2010). "Jerome Elston Scott". Film Monthly.

[2] "The writer/directors journey" jeromeelstonscott.com

[3] "Artist On Demand" http://www.blogtalkradio.com/artistsondemandradio/2010/12/08/jerome-elston-scott

[4]  "Olivia Wilder Blog Talk Radio"  http://www.blogtalkradio.com/olivia/2010/11/10/jerome-elston-scott

References 
[5] What would Toto Watch- https://web.archive.org/web/20101104090752/http://whatwouldtotowatch.com/2010/11/02/wwtw-interview-jerome-elston-scott-andersons-cross/

[6] Garrett, Tommy (October 27, 2010). "Filmmaker Jerome Elston Scott, Exclusive". Canyon News.

[7] "Moviemikes.com"-http://moviemikes.com/2010/11/dvd-review-andersons-cross/

[8] Tucker, Betty Jo (2010). "Jerome E. Scott - Director, Writer, Actor". Reel Talk. ReelTalk Movie Reviews

[9]  "Backstage" - http://www.backstage.com/bso/advice-ask-a-professional/who-has-taught-you-the-most-about-acting-1004134355.story

[10] TLA Gaybie Awards 2011 http://www.tlavideo.com/gaybies-2011/a-2

[11] jakewalden.com

[12] http://www.mediamikes.com/2010/11/interview-with-jerome-elston-scott/

[13] alphselectmovies.com

[14] https://www.facebook.com/beaulepaige

[15] Bourne, Ian (May 8, 2007). "FOLLOW-UP: BRIDGETOWN FILM FESTIVAL XTRA – FINALE / AWARDS, PT 5". The Bajan Reporter.

[16] Phillips, Joseph C. "Independent Black Film Festival Honors 2007 FADE IN Award Winners". May 18, 2007. African American News.

[17] Loomis, Daryl (January 6, 2011). "Anderson's Cross (review)". DVD Verdict.

External links 
 

American film directors
Living people
American male actors
Year of birth missing (living people)
Place of birth missing (living people)